Narma (previously known as Larma) is a village in the Paschim Medinipur district in West Bengal, India. The village is approximately 45 km from Kharagpur town, about halfway (22 km) along the road connecting Makhrampur and Temathani. This road passes through the village, dividing it into almost two equal parts. The nearest railway station is Balichak, about 30 km away.
 
It is the birthplace of Srila Bhakti Kumud Santa Maharaja, a monk who founded Acharya of Sri Gauranga Math (Kesiary), Sri Chaitanya Ashram (Kharagpur, Puri, Calcutta) and Sri Gaur Saraswat Santa Gaudiya Math (Chhekati and Baradiya).

References

External links
 Srila Bhakti Kumud Santa Maharaja
Shrila Bhaktikumuda Santa Goswami Maharaja
 Darshan of Srila Bhakti Kumud Santa Gosvami Maharaja on his appearance day festival. Some pictures of Srila Bhakti Kumud Santa Gosvami Maharaja on his appearance day. Kolkata
 Administrative Site
 Narma From Space

Villages in Paschim Medinipur district